Kürkçü   is a village in Bor district of Niğde Province, Turkey. It is situated to the north of Taurus Mountains. The population of Kürkçü was 106 as of 2011.

References 

Villages in Bor District, Niğde